Lebyazhye is a rural locality (a selo) in Kalininsky Selsoviet of Volodarsky District, Astrakhan Oblast, Russia. The population was 290 as of 2010. There are 2 streets.

Geography 
Lebyazhye is located 19 km east of Volodarsky (the district's administrative centre) by road. Baranovka is the nearest rural locality.

References 

Rural localities in Volodarsky District, Astrakhan Oblast